Xojiakbar Ulugʻbek oʻgʻli Alijonov (born 19 April 1997), known as Khojiakbar Alijonov, is an Uzbek footballer who plays as a rightback for FC Pakhtakor and Uzbekistan national football team.

International
Alijonov made his debut for the Uzbekistan national football team in a 4-0 friendly win over North Korea on 7 June 2019.

''Statistics accurate as of match played 11 June 2022.

References

External links

1997 births
Living people
Sportspeople from Tashkent
Uzbekistani footballers
Uzbekistan international footballers
Uzbekistan youth international footballers
Association football fullbacks
Uzbekistan Super League players
Pakhtakor Tashkent FK players
Asian Games competitors for Uzbekistan